Dominicus Claessens (c. 1635 – c. 1690) was a Flemish Baroque painter and engraver.

He became a master in the Guild of Saint Luke in Antwerp in 1660–1661. 

He previously made engravings for David Teniers the Younger for his Theatrum pictorium. One of these engravings was included by Joseph Strutt in his 1786 dictionary of engravers, though he felt that it was an inaccurate execution.

Guild membership granted him the right to sign and date his paintings, and a still-life of fruit on a table is signed and dated 1665.

References

16989 in the RKD

1620s births
1690s deaths
Painters from Antwerp
Artists from Brussels
Flemish Baroque painters